The Khazar raion is one of the 12 rayonlar in Baku, Azerbaijan. It has a population of 170,400.

Name
Before being renamed by the decision of the Parliament of Azerbaijan on May 11, 2010, the raion was called Azizbekov (Azerbaijani: Əzizbəyov) after Meshadi Azizbekov.

Municipalities
The raion contains the municipalities of Binə, Buzovna, Çilov-Neft Daşları, Gürgən-Pirallahı, Mərdəkan, Qala, Şağan, Şüvəlan, Türkan, and Zirə.

See also
 Khazars

References 

Districts of Baku